is the 6th major single by the Japanese girl idol group S/mileage. It was released in Japan on August 3, 2011 on the label Hachama.

The physical CD single debuted at number 4 in the Oricon daily singles chart.

In the Oricon weekly chart, it debuted at number 5.

B-sides 
The B-side of the regular edition was a cover of the song "Chu! Natsu Party", originally released as a single by a temporary Hello! Project group 3nin Matsuri. By that time it had already been covered by Berryz Kobo on their 2006 mini album 3 Natsu Natsu Mini Berryz.

Release 
The single was released in five versions: four limited editions (Limited Editions A, B, C, and  D) and a regular edition.

All the limited editions came with a sealed-in serial-numbered entry card for the lottery to win a ticket to one of the single's launch events.

The corresponding DVD single (so called Single V) was released 1 week later, on August 10, 2011.

Personnel 
S/mileage members: 
 Ayaka Wada
 Yūka Maeda
 Kanon Fukuda
 Saki Ogawa

Track listing

Regular Edition

Limited Editions A, B, C, D

Charts

References

External links 
 Profile of the CD single on the official website of Hello! Project
 Profile of the DVD single (Single V) on the official website of Hello! Project

2011 singles
Japanese-language songs
Angerme songs
Songs written by Tsunku
Song recordings produced by Tsunku
2011 songs